Louisiana Film Prize, often shorted to Film Prize, is an annual film contest and festival founded in 2012 by documentary filmmaker Gregory Kallenberg. The contest is directed by film producer and editor Chris Lyon, a longtime collaborator of Kallenberg's. The Louisiana Film Prize is held in Shreveport, Louisiana. The contest invites filmmakers from across the country to shoot a short film in a predefined geography — primarily centered in Shreveport and Caddo Parish — for the chance to win $50,000, one of the largest cash prizes for a short film in the world. Films may be no less than five minutes and no more than fifteen minutes total runtime. The prize winner is determined by both festival attendees and a judges panel, who are required to view all twenty shorts, separated into two slates of ten films each, and confirmed by punch card in order to place a vote. Each group accounts for 50% of the total vote. Filmmakers can also win grants for filmmaking for $3,000 through a separate voting process.

For the 2020 and 2021 competitions, the grand prize was reduced to $25,000 as the pandemic created fundraising challenges for organizers. The $50,000 prize was reinstated for the 2022 festival.

History

2012 Festival: Inaugural Year
The 2012 festival was attended by 1,700 people and the prize was won by Shreveport filmmakers Noah Scruggs, Thomas Woodruff, and Chris Armand for their film "The Legend of Luther Anderson."

2013 Festival
For the 2013 contest and festival, organizers are added additional prizes which can by won by filmmakers including five grants for $3,000, as opposed to three for the 2012 festival, for filmmakers to return and create a film for the 2014 festival. Prizes also included automatic admission to other film festivals around the country and distribution on iTunes and other avenues through Shorts International. The "Top 20" films competing in the 2013 contest were announced August 15, 2013 and the festival was held October 4–6, 2014. The New Orleans-based film "Silo" took home the grand prize in addition to a special state-sponsored "Cross/Cut" award.

2014 Festival
The 2014 Film Prize saw the addition of a best actor/actress prizes The Bradley and Alyce awards. Returning was the large cash prize, the Founders' Circle filmmaking grants, festival placement, and distribution opportunity via Shorts HD. The "Top 20" films who competed the 2014 contest were announced August 12, 2014. On October 12 at the Awards Brunch, it was announced that "True Heroes" by director Chris Ganucheau of New Orleans won the grand prize. The Alyce Best Actress and Bradley Best Actor awards were bestowed upon Chelsea Bryan of "Angel of Joy" and James Palmer of "Snip" respectively.

2015 Festival
The fourth Louisiana Film Prize was the largest by far in terms of attendance, filmmaker entries, and number of venues. Returning were the Bradley and Alyce actor/actress awards, Founders' Circle, festival placement, distribution, and the $50,000 cash prize. The Top 20 films were announced August 12, 2015. On October 4, it was announced that "The Bespoke Tailoring of Mister Bellamy" by director Alexander Jeffrey of El Dorado, Arkansas won the grand prize. The Top 5 were named as "American Virigin" by Tamzin Merchant, "Honey and the Hive" by Austin Alward, "Hut Hut" by Michael Almond and Courtney Sandifer, "Jackdaw" by Travis Champagne, and "The Bespoke Tailoring of Mister Bellamy" by Andrew Jeffrey. The Alyce Best Actress was Georgia Rose Bell of "Two Roads" and the Bradley Best Actor awards was given to Stan Brown of "The Bespoke Tailoring of Mister Bellamy", the first non-Louisiana film to win the grand prize.

2016 Festival
During the 2016 competition season, organizers founded the Memphis Film Prize competition which took place in Shelby County, Tennessee and consisted of 10 finalists and a $10,000 cash prize. The winner of the Memphis competition would also automatically become the 21st competitor in the Louisiana Film Prize. The Top 21 films were announced on August 16, 2016. The Top 5 films were "The Man from Mars" by Jonnie Stapleton, "Memoir" by Alexander Jeffery who won the 2015 grand prize, "Native" by Travis Bible and Stephen Kinigopolous, "The Stand" by Eva Contis, and "Ya Albi (My Heart)" by Christine Chen. Best Performance awards went to Frances Watson of "The Importance of Sex Education" and Kemerton Hargrove of "The 30 Year Deal." The grand prize was awarded to "The Man from Mars" by Jonnie Stapleton the first winner from California.

2017 Festival
The 2017 festival returned the number of competition films to 20 with Memphis Film Prize becoming a wholly independent competition. The competition also saw the largest number of film submissions to date for the Louisiana competition. The Top 5 films were "Candyland" by Taylor Bracewell, "Exit Strategy" by Travis Bible, "My Father's Son" by returning winner Kyle Clements, "Scoundrels" by Mark Blitch, and "Stag" by returning winner Jonnie Stapleton. Best performance awards were given to Danielle Wheeler of "Scoundrels" and Herbert Russel of "Stag." The grand prize was awarded to "Exit Strategy" by Travis Bible, marking the second California winner and third non-Louisiana-based filmmaker to win.

2018 Festival
The Top 5 films for the 2018 competition were "Esmerelda" by Paul Petersen, "Funky Butt" by returning winner Jonnie Stapleton, "Girl Steals Painting" by returning winner Alexander Jeffery, "Lilac Ocean Pumpkin Pine" by Sarah Phillips, and "War Paint" by J.C. Doler. The Best Performance winners were Jaya McSharma of "#BrownBridgetMD" and Isaac Clay of "Funky Butt." The grand prize was awarded to "Funky Butt" by Jonnie Stapleton of Los Angeles, which marks the first time a filmmaker won the competition twice.

2019 Festival
The Top 5 films for the 2019 competition were “Anniversary” by James Harlon Palmer, “Black Pajamas” by Hattie Haggard Gobble, “Ghosted” by Blayne Weaver, “Leo & Grace,” by Gabriel Savodivker, and “Maven Voyage” Rachel Emerson. Best Performance awards were given to Rachel Emerson for "Maven Voyage" and Richard Kohnke "...and that is why I succeed." The grand prize winner was "Anniversary" by James Harlon Palmer, marking the first winner from festival hometown Shreveport since the inaugural festival.

2020 Festival
In 2020, the competition kicked off as a standard competition year, but as the COVID-19 pandemic ravaged the world, organizers were forced to change key competition rules. First, organizers announced that filming could take place anywhere in Louisiana for the first time where previously it had been limited to a seven-parish area of Northwest Louisiana, though this “film-in-place” rule was available only to Louisiana resident filmmakers. Louisiana resident filmmakers were limited to filming with in a 30-mile radius of the director's residence to discourage unnecessary travel. Any filmmakers traveling to Louisiana from other states would still be required to film in the Northwest Louisiana area. The deadline was also extended from July to August to allow additional time for filmmaking while still maintaining the October festival dates. Finally, the competition was the lowering of the prize to $25,000 cash due to challenges in fundraising caused by the pandemic and the festival would take place entirely virtually. The Top 5 films were "Away" by Anne Nichols Brown, "Double Date Night" by Alexander Jeffery and Paul Petersen, "Imminent" by Topher Simon, "Nice to Meet You" by Michael Landry, and "Untitled Post-Baby Project" by Lorna Street Dopson. Best Performance accolades were awarded to Teri Wyble" for their role in "Nice to Meet You" and Garrett Kruithof for "Three Mile Hell." The grand prize winner was "Untitled Post-Baby Project" by Lorna Street Dopson, marking the first woman filmmaker winner in the festival's history.

Grand Prize Winners

Best Performance Winners 
The Film Prize award for best performance began in 2014 with two categories, Best Performance by an Actor and Best Performance by an Actress. In 2022, the gendered awards were removed to create a single winner category.

References 

American film awards
Film festivals in Louisiana